Girardinus is a genus of poeciliids native to Cuba. The name of this genus honours the French zoologist Charles Frédéric Girard (1822-1895) for his work on the freshwater fish of North America.

Species
There are currently seven recognized species in this genus:
 Girardinus creolus Garman, 1895 (Creole topminnow)
 Girardinus cubensis (C. H. Eigenmann, 1903) (Cuban topminnow)
 Girardinus denticulatus Garman, 1895 (Toothy topminnow)
 Girardinus falcatus (C. H. Eigenmann, 1903) (Goldbelly topminnow)
 Girardinus metallicus Poey, 1854 (Metallic livebearer)
 Girardinus microdactylus Rivas, 1944 (Smallfinger topminnow)
 Girardinus uninotatus Poey, 1860 (Singlespot topminnow)

References

 
Poeciliidae
Fish of Central America
Freshwater fish genera
Taxa named by Felipe Poey
Ray-finned fish genera
Endemic fauna of Cuba